A golem is an animated, anthropomorphic being in Jewish folklore, which is entirely created from inanimate matter, usually clay or mud. The most famous golem narrative involves Judah Loew ben Bezalel, the late 16th-century rabbi of Prague. According to Moment magazine, "the golem is a highly mutable metaphor with seemingly limitless symbolism. It can be a victim or villain, man or woman—or sometimes both. Over the centuries, it has been used to connote war, community, isolation, hope, and despair."

Etymology
The word golem occurs once in the Bible in Psalm 139:16, which uses the word  (my golem), that means "my light form", "raw" material, connoting the unfinished human being before God's eyes. The Mishnah uses the term for an uncultivated person: "Seven characteristics are in an uncultivated person, and seven in a learned one", (Avot 5:7 in the Hebrew text; English translations vary).

In Modern Hebrew,  is used to mean "dumb" or "helpless" and also to describe an insect in its inactive immature form between larva and adult. Similarly, it is often used today as a metaphor for a mindless lunk or entity that serves a man under controlled conditions, but is hostile to him under other conditions.

History

Earliest stories
The oldest stories of golems date to early Judaism. In the Talmud (Tractate Sanhedrin 38b), Adam was initially created as a golem when his dust was "kneaded into a shapeless husk". Like Adam, all golems are created from mud by those close to divinity, but no anthropogenic golem is fully human. Early on, the main disability of the golem was its inability to speak. Sanhedrin 65b describes Rava creating a man. He sent the man to Rav Zeira. Rav Zeira spoke to him, but he did not answer. Rav Zeira said, "You were created by the sages; return to your dust".

During the Middle Ages, passages from the Sefer Yetzirah (Book of Formation) were studied as a means to create and animate a golem, although little in the writings of Jewish mysticism supports this belief.

A golem is inscribed with Hebrew words in some tales (for example, some versions of Chełm and Prague, as well as in Polish tales and versions of the Brothers Grimm), such as the word  ("truth" in Hebrew) written on its forehead.

The earliest known written account of how to create a golem can be found in Sodei Razayya by Eleazar ben Judah of Worms of the late 12th and early 13th centuries.

Samuel of Speyer (12th century) was said to have created a golem.

One source credits 11th-century Solomon ibn Gabirol with creating a golem, possibly female, for household chores.

In 1625, Joseph Delmedigo wrote that "many legends of this sort are current, particularly in Germany."

The Golem of Chełm

The oldest description of the creation of a golem by a historical figure is included in a tradition connected to Rabbi Eliyahu of Chełm (1550–1583).

A Polish Kabbalist, writing in about 1630–1650, reported the creation of a golem by Rabbi Eliyahu thusly: "And I have heard, in a certain and explicit way, from several respectable persons that one man [living] close to our time, whose name is R. Eliyahu, the master of the name, who made a creature out of matter [Heb. Golem] and form [Heb. tzurah] and it performed hard work for him, for a long period, and the name of emet was hanging upon his neck until he finally removed it for a certain reason, the name from his neck and it turned to dust." A similar account was reported by a Christian author, Christoph Arnold, in 1674.

Rabbi Jacob Emden (d. 1776) elaborated on the story in a book published in 1748: "As an aside, I'll mention here what I heard from my father's holy mouth regarding the Golem created by his ancestor, the Gaon R. Eliyahu Ba'al Shem of blessed memory. When the Gaon saw that the Golem was growing larger and larger, he feared that the Golem would destroy the universe. He then removed the Holy Name that was embedded on his forehead, thus causing him to disintegrate and return to dust. Nonetheless, while he was engaged in extracting the Holy Name from him, the Golem injured him, scarring him on the face."

According to the Polish Kabbalist, "the legend was known to several persons, thus allowing us to speculate that the legend had indeed circulated for some time before it was committed to writing and, consequently, we may assume that its origins are to be traced to the generation immediately following the death of R. Eliyahu, if not earlier."

The classic narrative: The Golem of Prague

The most famous golem narrative involves Judah Loew ben Bezalel, the late 16th-century rabbi of Prague, also known as the Maharal, who reportedly "created a golem out of clay from the banks of the Vltava River and brought it to life through rituals and Hebrew incantations to defend the Prague ghetto from anti-Semitic attacks and pogroms". Depending on the version of the legend, the Jews in Prague were to be either expelled or killed under the rule of Rudolf II, the Holy Roman Emperor. The Golem was called Josef and was known as Yossele. He was said to be able to make himself invisible and summon spirits from the dead. Rabbi Loew deactivated the Golem on Friday evenings by removing the shem before the Sabbath (Saturday) began, so as to let it rest on Sabbath.

One Friday evening, Rabbi Loew forgot to remove the shem, and feared that the Golem would desecrate the Sabbath. A different story tells of a golem that fell in love, and when rejected, became the violent monster seen in most accounts. Some versions have the golem eventually going on a murderous rampage. The rabbi then managed to pull the shem from his mouth and immobilize him in front of the synagogue, whereupon the golem fell in pieces. The Golem's body was stored in the attic genizah of the Old New Synagogue, where it would be restored to life again if needed.

Rabbi Loew then forbade anyone except his successors from going into the attic. Rabbi Yechezkel Landau, a successor of Rabbi Loew, reportedly wanted to go up the steps to the attic when he was Chief Rabbi of Prague to verify the tradition. Rabbi Landau fasted and immersed himself in a mikveh, wrapped himself in phylacteries and a prayer-shawl and started ascending the steps. At the top of the steps, he hesitated and then came immediately back down, trembling and frightened. He then re-enacted Rabbi Loew's original warning.

According to legend, the body of Rabbi Loew's Golem still lies in the synagogue's attic. When the attic was renovated in 1883, no evidence of the Golem was found. Some versions of the tale state that the Golem was stolen from the genizah and entombed in a graveyard in Prague's Žižkov district, where the Žižkov Television Tower now stands. A recent legend tells of a Nazi agent ascending to the synagogue attic, dying under suspicious circumstances thereafter. The attic is not open to the general public.

Some Orthodox Jews believe that the Maharal did actually create a golem. The evidence for this belief has been analyzed from an Orthodox Jewish perspective by Shnayer Z. Leiman.

Sources of the Prague narrative
The general view of historians and critics is that the story of the Golem of Prague was a German literary invention of the early 19th century. According to John Neubauer, the first writers on the Prague Golem were:
 1837: Berthold Auerbach, Spinoza
 1841: Gustav Philippson, Der Golam, eine Legende
 1841: Franz Klutschak, Der Golam des Rabbi Löw
 1842: Adam Tendlau Der Golem des Hoch-Rabbi-Löw
 1847: Leopold Weisel, Der Golem

A few slightly earlier examples are known, in 1834 and 1836.

All of these early accounts of the Golem of Prague are in German by Jewish writers. They are suggested to have emerged as part of a Jewish folklore movement parallel with the contemporary German folklore movement.

The origins of the story have been obscured by attempts to exaggerate its age and to pretend that it dates from the time of the Maharal. Rabbi Yudel Rosenberg (1859–1935) of Tarłów, before moving to Canada where he became one of its most prominent rabbis, is said to have originated the idea that the narrative dates from the time of the Maharal. Rosenberg published Nifl'os Maharal (Wonders of Maharal) (Piotrków, 1909), which purported to be an eyewitness account by the Maharal's son-in-law, who had helped to create the Golem.

Rosenberg claimed that the book was based upon a manuscript that he found in the main library in Metz. Wonders of Maharal "is generally recognized in academic circles to be a literary hoax". Gershom Sholem observed that the manuscript "contains not ancient legends, but modern fiction". Rosenberg's claim was further disseminated in Chayim Bloch's (1881–1973) The Golem: Legends of the Ghetto of Prague, English edition 1925.

The Jewish Encyclopedia of 1906 cites the historical work Zemach David by David Gans, a disciple of the Maharal, published in 1592. In it, Gans writes of an audience between the Maharal and Rudolph II: "Our lord the emperor ... Rudolph ... sent for and called upon our master Rabbi Low ben Bezalel and received him with a welcome and merry expression, and spoke to him face to face, as one would to a friend. The nature and quality of their words are mysterious, sealed, and hidden."

But it has been said of this passage, "Even when [the Maharal is] eulogized, whether in David Gans' Zemach David or on his epitaph ..., not a word is said about the creation of a golem. No Hebrew work published in the 16th, 17th, and 18th centuries (even in Prague) is aware that the Maharal created a golem." Furthermore, the Maharal himself did not refer to the Golem in his writings. Rabbi Yedidiah Tiah Weil (1721–1805), a Prague resident, who described the creation of golems, including those created by Rabbis Avigdor Kara of Prague (died 1439) and Eliyahu of Chelm, did not mention the Maharal. Rabbi Meir Perils' biography of the Maharal published in 1718 does not mention a golem.

The Golem of Vilna
A similar tradition relates to the Vilna Gaon or "the saintly genius from Vilnius" (1720–1797). Rabbi Chaim Volozhin (Lithuania 1749–1821) reported in an introduction to Sifra de Tzeniuta that he once presented to his teacher, the Vilna Gaon, ten different versions of a certain passage in the Sefer Yetzira and asked the Gaon to determine the correct text. The Gaon immediately identified one version as the accurate rendition of the passage.

The amazed student then commented to his teacher that, with such clarity, he should easily be able to create a live human. The Gaon affirmed Rabbi Chaim's assertion and said that he once began to create a person when he was a child, under the age of 13, but during the process, he received a sign from Heaven ordering him to desist because of his tender age.

Theme of hubris

The existence of a golem is sometimes a mixed blessing. Golems are not intelligent, and if commanded to perform a task, they will perform the instructions literally. In many depictions, golems are inherently perfectly obedient. In its earliest known modern form, the Golem of Chełm became enormous and uncooperative. In one version of this story, the rabbi had to resort to trickery to deactivate it, whereupon it crumbled upon its creator and crushed him.

A similar theme of hubris is seen in Frankenstein, The Sorcerer's Apprentice, and some other stories in popular culture, such as The Terminator. The theme manifests itself in R.U.R. (Rossum's Universal Robots), Karel Čapek's 1921 play that coined the term robot. The play was written in Prague, and while Čapek denied that he modeled the robot after the golem, many similarities are seen in the plot.

Culture of the Czech Republic
The golem is a popular figure in the Czech Republic. The 1915 novel by Gustav Meyrink (The Golem) was briefly popular and did much to keep the imagination about the golem going. Several restaurants and other businesses have names that make reference to the creature. A Czech strongman, René Richter goes by the nickname "Golem", and a Czech monster truck outfit calls itself the "Golem Team".

Abraham Akkerman preceded his article on human automatism in the contemporary city with a short satirical poem on a pair of golems turning human.

Clay Boy variation
A Yiddish and Slavic folktale is the Clay Boy, which combines elements of the golem and The Gingerbread Man, in which a lonely couple makes a child out of clay, with disastrous or comical consequences.

In one common Russian version, an older couple, whose children have left home, make a boy out of clay and dry him by their hearth. The Clay Boy comes to life; at first, the couple is delighted and treats him like a real child, but the Clay Boy does not stop growing and eats all their food, then all their livestock, and then the Clay Boy eats his parents. The Clay Boy rampages through the village until he is smashed by a quick-thinking goat.

Golem in popular culture

Film and television 
Golems are frequently depicted in movies and television shows. Programs with them in the title include:

 The Golem (shown in the United States as The Monster of Fate), a 1915 German silent horror film, written and directed by Paul Wegener and Henrik Galeen.
 The Golem and the Dancing Girl, a 1917 German silent comedy-horror film, directed by Paul Wegener and Rochus Gliese.
 The Golem: How He Came into the World (also referred to as Der Golem), a 1920 German silent horror film, directed by Paul Wegener and Carl Boese.
 Le Golem, a 1936 Czechoslovak monster movie directed by Julien Duvivier in French.
Other references to golems in popular culture include:
 The Golem, the first novel by Gustav Meyrink and adapted for television in 1967, for film in 1980, and for the stage in 2013.
 Daimajin, a 1966 Japanese kaiju film directed by Kimiyoshi Yasuda.
 It!, a 1967 British horror film directed by Herbert J. Leder.
 "Kaddish", a 1997 episode of The X-Files.
 The 1995 Gargoyles episode "Golem" featured a golem made in the image of a stone statue that was created by Rabbi Loew (voiced by Victor Brandt) to defend the Jewish inhabitants of Prague from raiders and had been passed down to his ancestor Max Loew (voiced by Scott Weil). The golem was stolen by Tomas Brod (voiced by Clancy Brown) and his men so that Halycon Renard can transfer his soul into its body. Renard briefly caused havoc in his body before Goliath persuaded him to undo the transfer. Once that was done, Max used the golem to defeat Brod.
 "You Gotta Know When to Golem" is a short story during "Treehouse of Horror XVII", part of the long-running series of The Simpsons Halloween specials. The Golem, voiced by Richard Lewis, is controlled via paper notes by Bart and used to wreak havoc on the citizens of Springfield. 
 "Denial, Anger, Acceptance", a 1999 episode of The Sopranos. Tony Soprano is approached by a Hasidic business owner with a troublesome son-in-law he wants intimidated into giving up his claim on the business he has helped build up. When confronted by members of Tony's crew, the enraged man tells his father-in-law he has created a Golem, and later, when Tony insists on claiming the 25% of the business that was offered, the businessman realizes the metaphoric truth of this, calling Tony a monster of his own creation, made of mud, a Golem. When Tony asks what that is, he says a Frankenstein (since many believe the Golem legend partly inspired Mary Shelley to write her novel).  
 In the 4th episode of season 4 of Grimm ("Dyin' on a Prayer"), a golem plays an important role.  
 The 2013 Supernatural episode "Everybody Hates Hitler" features a golem (portrayed by John DeSantis) who had been used to fight the Nazis in Belarus during World War II. In the present, the golem has been passed down from Rabbi Bass (portrayed by Hal Linden) to his grandson Aaron Bass (portrayed by Adam Rose). While Aaron had a hard time controlling the golem at first, they did help Sam Winchester and Dean Winchester fight against a group of Nazi necromancers led by Commandant Eckhart (portrayed by Bernhard Forcher).
 In the SyFy series The Magicians there is a golem made of a main character. It appears in the episodes "Homecoming" and "Be The Penny".
 The 2019 Netflix series The Order features a recurring character (portrayed by Dylan Playfair) who is revealed to be a golem in season 1. 
 The majority of the CW series Legacies (a spin-off of The Vampire Diaries) centers around defeating a golem. 
 The Golem, a 2018 Israeli horror film features a golem in the form of a dead child.

Literature
 Marge Piercy's 1991 science fiction novel, He, She, and It, features intertwined narratives, one of which is a retelling of the story of Rabbi Loew and his creation of a golem in medieval Prague.
 Sir Terry Pratchett's 1996 Discworld novel Feet Of Clay feature a number of Golems who reside in the city of Ankh-Morpork. Golems also appear in Going Postal and Making Money and make cameos throughout the remainder of the series.
 The 2004 book The Golem's Eye by Jonathan Stroud features a magically rendered golem as the main threat.
 The Marvel Comics superhero, Captain America, as the character's creators, Joe Simon and Jack Kirby, originally conceived of him, has been described as a variant of the Golem concept: a protector of the Jewish community created by one of its elders (Dr. Abraham Erskine).
 The Golem and the Jinni is a debut novel written by Helene Wecker, published by Harper in April 2013. It combines the genre of historical fiction with elements of fantasy, telling the story of two displaced magical creatures in 19th century New York City, reflecting the fate of contemporary immigrants to the USA.

Tabletop and video games
 Golems appear in the fantasy role-playing game Dungeons & Dragons (first published in the 1970s), and the influence of Dungeons & Dragons has led to the inclusion of golems in other tabletop role-playing games, as well as in video games. There are many varieties of golems in the game. The clay golem is based on the golem of Medieval Jewish folklore, though changed from "a cherished defender to an unthinking hulk". The flesh golem is related to Frankenstein's monster as Universal's 1931 film, seen in e.g. being empowered by electricity, though again with the difference of being essentially an unthinking machine in the game. D&D'''s golems are also rooted in Gothic fiction more generally, and are typical denizens of the Ravenloft setting. The flesh golem was ranked ninth among the ten best mid-level monsters by the authors of Dungeons & Dragons For Dummies for both 3rd and 4th edition.

Music
 A number of scores have been written to accompany or based on the 1920 film, including by Daniel Hoffman and performed by the San Francisco-based ensemble Davka and by Karl-Errnst Sasse.
 In 1962, Abraham Ellstein's opera The Golem'', commissioned by the New York City Opera, premiered at City Opera, New York.
 In 1994, composer Richard Teitelbaum composed "Golem", based on the Prague legend and combining music with electronics.

See also

 Artificial intelligence
 Brazen head
 Czech folklore
 Frankenstein's monster
 The Gingerbread Man and Kolobok (edible golems)
 Homunculus
 Pinocchio
 Prometheus
 Pygmalion and Galatea (mythology)
 Creation of life from clay
 Shabti
 Talos
 Tulpa
 Tupilaq
 Zombie

References

Further reading
 
 
 
 
 
 
 
 
 
 
 
 
 
  Translated (2008) as Jewish Stories of Prague, Jewish Prague in History and Legend. .

External links

 "Golem of Prague, Fact or Ficton?" on Yutorah.org

 
Czech folklore
Hebrew-language names
Kabbalistic words and phrases
Medieval legends
Practical Kabbalah
History of Prague
Supernatural legends
Urban legends